Alvin Hayes is an American jazz saxophonist and flautist.

Hayes' album Star Gaze reached No. 21 on the contemporary jazz album chart at Billboard magazine, while Passion Flower reached No. 13. Hayes's band included guitarist Scott Carter, who recorded with him for both the TBA and Palo Alto labels.

Discography
1987: Star Gaze (TBA Records)
1988: Passion Flower (Palo Alto)
1989: All the Way (TBA Records)

References

External links
 Official site

Year of birth missing (living people)
Living people
21st-century American male musicians
21st-century American saxophonists
American jazz saxophonists
American male saxophonists
American jazz flautists
American male jazz musicians
Palo Alto Records artists
21st-century flautists